Anderle is a surname of German origin meaning "little Andrew/Andreas". Notable people with the surname include:

David Anderle, record producer
Jiří Anderle (born 1936), Czech painter and graphic artist
Ádám Anderle (1943–2016), Hungarian historian, hispanist
Mathias Anderle (born 1993), American singer-songwriter
Natália Anderle, Miss Brazil 2008

See also
8048 Andrle (1995 DB1), a main-belt asteroid

German-language surnames